Waverley Borough Council is the local authority for the Borough of Waverley, Surrey. The council is elected every four years.

Political control

Leadership
The leaders of the council since 2003 have been:

Council elections
1973 Waverley District Council election
1976 Waverley District Council election
1979 Waverley District Council election
1983 Waverley District Council election (New ward boundaries)
1987 Waverley Borough Council election (Borough boundary changes took place but the number of seats remained the same)
1991 Waverley Borough Council election
1995 Waverley Borough Council election (Borough boundary changes took place but the number of seats remained the same)
1999 Waverley Borough Council election

2011 Waverley Borough Council election
2015 Waverley Borough Council election
2019 Waverley Borough Council election

By-election results

1995-1999

1999-2003

2003-2007

2011-2015

2015-2019

2019-2023

References

External links
Waverley Borough Council

 
Council elections in Surrey
District council elections in England